Ērgļi Municipality is a former municipality in Vidzeme, Latvia. The municipality was formed in 2006 by merging Ērgļi Parish, Jumurda Parish and Sausnēja Parish, the administrative centre being Ērgļi. The population in 2020 was 2,611.

On 1 July 2021, Ērgļi Municipality ceased to exist and its territory was merged into Madona Municipality.

See also 
 Administrative divisions of Latvia

References

External links 
 

 
Former municipalities of Latvia